Geoffroy du Breuil of Vigeois was a 12th-century French chronicler, trained at the Benedictine abbey of Saint-Martial of Limoges, the site of a great early library. Geoffroy became abbot at Vigeois (1170–1184) where he composed his Chroniques which trace in detail some great local families, often Geoffroy's forebears and kin, while relating events happening from 994 to 1184: the fiery convulsive sickness, (actually ergotism from a fungus or ergot of wheat), the preparations for the First Crusade, reports of combats in the Holy Land, the spread of Cathar beliefs (writing in 1181, he was the first to use the term Albigensians), all the while unconsciously revealing the preoccupations and manners of the times.

Bibliography
Geoffrey of Vigeois. "Chronica Gaufredi coenobitae monasterii D. Martialis Lemovicensis, ac prioris Vosiensis coenobii." In: 
 La chronique de Geoffroi de Breuil, prieur de Vigeois, éd. Pierre Botineau et Jean-Loup Lemaître, trad. Bernadette Barrière, mise en forme et annotations, Stéphane Lafaye, Jean-Marie Allard, Jean-François Boyer, Robert Chanaud, Catherine Faure, Luc Ferrand, Évelyne Proust, Christian Rémy et Étienne Rouziès, Paris, éditions de Boccard, 2021 (Société de l’Histoire de France).

External links
History of the Romanesque Abbey of Vigeois (French)
His chronicle, in Latin, on Gallica

French Benedictines
French chroniclers
French abbots
12th-century French historians
12th-century French Roman Catholic priests
Year of birth unknown
Year of death unknown
French male writers
12th-century Latin writers